Vilmos Zsigmond ASC (June 16, 1930 – January 1, 2016) was a Hungarian-American cinematographer. His work in cinematography helped shape the look of American movies in the 1970s, making him one of the leading figures in the American New Wave movement.

Over his career he became associated with many leading American directors, such as Robert Altman, Steven Spielberg, Brian De Palma, Michael Cimino and Woody Allen. He is best known for his work on the films Close Encounters of the Third Kind and The Deer Hunter.

He won the Academy Award for Best Cinematography for his work on Close Encounters of the Third Kind as well as the BAFTA Award for Best Cinematography for The Deer Hunter. He also won the Emmy Award for Outstanding Individual Achievement in Cinematography for a Miniseries or a Special for the HBO miniseries Stalin.

His work on the films McCabe and Mrs. Miller, Close Encounters of the Third Kind and The Deer Hunter made the American Society of Cinematographers (ASC) list of the top 50 best-shot films from 1950–97.  The ASC also awarded him with their Lifetime Achievement Award in 1998.

In 2003, Zsigmond was voted as one of the ten most influential cinematographers in history by the members of the International Cinematographers Guild.

Life and career
Zsigmond was born in Szeged, Hungary, the son of Bozena (née Illichman), an administrator, and Vilmos Zsigmond, a soccer player and coach. He became interested in photography at age 17 after an uncle had given him The Art of Light, a book of black-and-white photographs taken by Hungarian photographer Eugene Dulovits, but under the Soviet-imposed government of the Hungarian People's Republic he was not allowed to study the subject because his family was considered bourgeois. Instead, Zsigmond worked in a factory, bought a camera and taught himself how to take pictures, going on to organize a camera club for the workers. As a result he won the respect of local commissars and was allowed to study cinema at the Academy of Drama and Film in Budapest and received an MA in cinematography. He worked for five years in a Budapest feature film studio becoming director of photography.

Zsigmond, along with his friend and fellow student László Kovács, borrowed a 35-millimeter camera from their school and chronicled the events of the 1956 Hungarian Revolution in Budapest by hiding the camera in a shopping bag and shooting footage through a hole they had cut in the bag. The two men shot thirty thousand feet of film and escaped to Austria shortly afterwards. In 1958 Zsigmond and Kovács arrived in the United States as political refugees and sold the footage to CBS for a network documentary on the revolution narrated by Walter Cronkite.

In 1962, Zsigmond became a naturalized citizen of the United States. He settled in Los Angeles and worked in photo labs as a technician and photographer. The first film he worked on in the United States was the 1963 black-and-white exploitation film The Sadist, starring Arch Hall Jr. Throughout the 1960s, he worked on many low-budget independent and educational films as he attempted to break into the film industry. Some of the films that he worked on during this period credited him as "William Zsigmond", including The Sadist, the classic horror B movie The Incredibly Strange Creatures Who Stopped Living and Became Mixed-Up Zombies, and the Second City satirical science fiction movie The Monitors.

Kovács, who shot the 1969 film Easy Rider for Peter Fonda and Dennis Hopper, recommended Zsigmond to Fonda for his 1971 Western film The Hired Hand. Later that same year Zsigmond was hired by Robert Altman for his revisionist western  film McCabe & Mrs. Miller, which became Zsigmond's breakthrough film and marked his first time working on a major Hollywood production.

Over the following decade, Zsigmond became one of the most in-demand cinematographers in Hollywood. Some of the major films he shot in the 1970s include John Boorman's Deliverance, Altman's The Long Goodbye, Brian De Palma's Obsession as well as Steven Spielberg's  The Sugarland Express and Close Encounters of the Third Kind, the latter of which won him the Academy Award for Best Cinematography at the 50th Academy Awards.

In 1978, Zsigmond worked on Michael Cimino’s drama The Deer Hunter, starring Robert DeNiro, Meryl Streep and Christopher Walken. Zsigmond's visual work on the film earned him the 1980 BAFTA Award for Best Cinematography and another Academy Award nomination.  Zsigmond again worked with Cimino on his 1980 epic Western Heaven's Gate.

Zsigmond continued to be in demand in the years that followed, working multiple times with several directors. He again worked with De Palma on his films Blow Out, The Bonfire of the Vanities, and The Black Dahlia. He worked with Mark Rydell on Cinderella Liberty, The Rose, The River, and Intersection. He worked with George Miller on The Witches of Eastwick and with Kevin Smith on Jersey Girl. He also worked with Woody Allen on Melinda and Melinda, Cassandra's Dream, and You Will Meet a Tall Dark Stranger.

Zsigmond's television work includes the HBO miniseries Stalin, for which he won the 1993 Emmy Award for Outstanding Individual Achievement in Cinematography for a Miniseries or a Special. He was nominated for an Emmy for his work on 2001 miniseries The Mists of Avalon. Zsigmond also shot 24 episodes of The Mindy Project between 2012 and 2014.

Vilmos' life and career was featured in No Subtitles Necessary: Laszlo & Vilmos, a bio-documentary that aired on PBS's Independent Lens in 2009.

In 2011 Zsigmond co-founded the Global Cinematography Institute in Los Angeles, California along with fellow cinematographer Yuri Neyman. 
The Institute provides an advanced cinematography educational program for postgraduate students and veteran filmmakers.

He was a longtime user and endorser of Tiffen filters and is associated with the technique known as flashing or pre-fogging, which involves carefully exposing the film negative to a small, controlled amount of light in order to create a muted color palette.

Death
On January 1, 2016, Zsigmond died at his home in Big Sur, California at age 85.

Awards and honors
 Oscar, 1977, Close Encounters of the Third Kind
 BAFTA Award for Best Cinematography, 1978, The Deer Hunter
 National Society of Film Critics Award for Best Cinematography, 1973, The Long Goodbye
 Emmy Award, 1993, Stalin
 Nomination, BAFTA, 1971, McCabe & Mrs. Miller
 Nomination, BAFTA, 1977, Close Encounters of the Third Kind
 Nomination, Academy Award, 1978, The Deer Hunter
 Nomination, Academy Award, 1984, Mark Rydell's The River
 Nomination, Emmy Award, 2002, Marion Zimmer Bradley's The Mists of Avalon
 Nomination, Academy Award, 2006, The Black Dahlia
 Lifetime Achievement Award, 1997, from the Camerimage Festival
 Lifetime Achievement Award, 1999, from the American Society of Cinematographers
 Lifetime Achievement Award, 2010, from the Manaki Brothers Film Festival
 Lifetime Achievement Award, 2014, from the Cannes Film Festival

Filmography

The Hired Hand (1971)
McCabe & Mrs. Miller (1971)
Images (1972)
Deliverance (1972)
The Long Goodbye (1973)
Scarecrow (1973)
Cinderella Liberty (1973)
The Sugarland Express (1974)
Obsession (1976)
Close Encounters of the Third Kind (1977)
The Deer Hunter (1978)
The Rose (1979)
Heaven's Gate (1980)
Blow Out (1981)
The River (1984)
Real Genius (1985)
The Witches of Eastwick (1987)
The Bonfire of the Vanities (1990)
The Two Jakes (1990)
Stalin (1992)
Sliver (1993)
Maverick (1994)
Assassins (1995)
The Ghost and the Darkness (1996)
Life as a House (2001)
Melinda and Melinda (2004)
The Black Dahlia (2006)
Cassandra's Dream (2007)
You Will Meet a Tall Dark Stranger (2010)

See also
 No Subtitles Necessary: Laszlo & Vilmos (2008)

References

External links

 
 Internet Encyclopedia of Cinematographers profile
 Budapest Cinematographers MasterClass's Master

1930 births
2016 deaths
Best Cinematographer Academy Award winners
Best Cinematography BAFTA Award winners
Hungarian cinematographers
Hungarian film producers
Hungarian emigrants to the United States
People from Szeged